Heather Beth Henson (born December 19, 1970) is an American contemporary puppet artist, the daughter of Jim Henson. She serves on The Jim Henson Company, The Jim Henson Legacy, and the Jim Henson Foundation Boards of Directors. She is also a Trustee of the Eugene O'Neill Theater Center in Connecticut.

Early life 
Henson was born on December 19, 1970, in New York City, the youngest child of Jim (1936–1990) and Jane Henson (1934–2013). She has four siblings: Lisa Henson (born 1960), Cheryl Henson (born 1961), Brian Henson (born 1963), and John Henson (1965–2014).

Career 
Henson is a graduate of George School and the Rhode Island School of Design, and attended the California Institute of the Arts. Her on-screen appearances include the Number Three Ball Film and The Muppets Take Manhattan, The Storyteller episode "Hans My Hedgehog," the role of Prince Kermit in The Frog Prince, as well as Frank Oz's film Little Shop of Horrors.

Heather is the owner of IBEX Puppetry which is an entertainment company dedicated to promoting the art of puppetry in all of its various mediums, including stage, cinema and gallery exhibitions. IBEX projects include Handmade Puppet Dreams, The Orlando Puppet Festival, The Puppet Slam Network and environmental spectacles including "Panther and Crane," a drama about preserving the Florida ecosystem in modern times.

References

External links 
Ibex Puppetry Official website
 

1970 births
American puppeteers
California Institute of the Arts alumni
Henson family (show business)
Jim Henson
Living people
Place of birth missing (living people)
Rhode Island School of Design alumni
The Jim Henson Company people